Tegan Moss (born February 7, 1985) is a Canadian actress appearing in film and television. She was nominated for Young Artist Awards in 1997 and 2000.

Biography 
Moss was born in Vancouver, British Columbia. She has two brothers, Rory Moss, and actor Jesse Moss. Her given name is of Welsh origin, meaning "fair one" and pronounced to rhyme with "Megan". Moss had attended the Point Grey Secondary School and graduated in June 2003.

Moss appears in the films Free Style and Dr. Dolittle: Million Dollar Mutts. She appeared in the movie Sea People as Amanda Forrest.

Filmography

Awards/Nominations

References

External links 
 

1985 births
Canadian film actresses
Canadian television actresses
Canadian voice actresses
Living people
Actresses from Vancouver
Canadian child actresses